The LSWR 395 class was a class of goods 0-6-0 steam locomotives designed for the London and South Western Railway by William Adams as part of his modernisation programme. All 70 were constructed by Neilson and Company between 1881 and 1886. The last 34 locomotives differed in being slightly longer and heavier.

On the LSWR 1881-1923
Early members of the class were numbered in a continuous series of new numbers 395-406. Some later batches re-used numbers of withdrawn or duplicated locomotives. The 395 was a long-lived class, with several lasting for 70 years. Between 1908 and 1924, 54 locomotives were renumbered to the duplicate list by prefixing their existing number with a "0".

Outside the UK 1916-1945
Between 1916 and 1918, fifty locomotives were sold to the British Government for use by the Railway Operating Division of the Royal Engineers. These included all 16 not in the duplicate list. The ROD transferred 36 of the class to its Palestine Military Railway and nine for service in the Mesopotamian campaign. In 1918, seven of those delivered to Palestine were transferred to Mesopotamia.

In 1919, military-controlled railways and equipment in Mesopotamia were transferred to the civilian Mesopotamian Railways, including all 16 class 395's which the new company renumbered 423-438. In 1920 the civilian Palestine Railways was formed and took over the remaining PMR lines and stock, including all 29 class 395's remaining in Palestine. In 1928 PR withdrew 22 of the class and sold them for scrap. The remaining seven (0166, 0395, 0398, 0405, 0444, 503 and 508) remained in PR service until 1936 and were not scrapped until 1944-45.

In the UK 1923-1959

After the First World War, twenty class 395's remained in Great Britain in L&SWR service: 029, 083, 0101, 0153–0155, 0163, 0167, 0397, 0400, 0433, 0436, 0439–0442, 0496, 0506, 0509, 0515. As per the Railways Act 1921, these passed to the Southern Railway (SR) on its formation in 1923. In 1933, the SR withdrew 0153 and 0515. In 1948 under the nationalisation of Britain's Railways, the remaining 18 locomotives entered British Railways stock and were renumbered in a continuous series 30564–30581. Withdrawals resumed in 1950, with the last one, 30567 (originally 154) being withdrawn in September 1959 after 76 years of service. All were scrapped.

References

395
0-6-0 locomotives
Neilson locomotives
Railway Operating Division locomotives
Railway locomotives introduced in 1881
Scrapped locomotives
Standard gauge steam locomotives of Great Britain